Border War may refer to:

Military conflicts
Border War or Bleeding Kansas (1854–1859), a series of violent events involving Free-Staters and pro-slavery elements prior to the American Civil War
Border War (1910–1919), border conflicts between the United States and Mexico
South African Border War (1966–1989) in Namibia and Angola
List of border conflicts for wars fought on borders

Sports
 Border Wars (professional wrestling), an annual professional wrestling pay-per-view event
 Border Wars (2012 wrestling event), the 2012 event
 Border Wars (2013 wrestling event), the 2013 event

Athletic rivalries
Border War (Kansas–Missouri rivalry), officially known as the "Border Showdown" after September 11, 2001, the sports rivalry between the University of Kansas and the University of Missouri 
Border War (Colorado State–Wyoming rivalry), the sports rivalry between Colorado State University and the University of Wyoming
Oregon–Washington football rivalry, the college football game played between the University of Oregon and the University of Washington
Maine–New Hampshire men's ice hockey rivalry, the men's college ice hockey rivalry between the New Hampshire Wildcats and the Maine Black Bears

Other uses
Border War: The Battle Over Illegal Immigration, a 2006 documentary about the U.S.–Mexico border
 Border Wars (TV series), a television series on the National Geographic Channel
 Border Wars (album) an album by American rappers Berner and The Jacka

See also 
 Border Battle (disambiguation)